Peter Ďurica (born 3 May 1986) is a Slovak footballer, who plays for FC Mönchhof.

Career
The midfielder played professional for the Slovak Corgoň Liga club FK Dukla Banská Bystrica.

External sources
 Eurofotbal profile

Notes

1986 births
Living people
Slovak footballers
Association football midfielders
FK Dukla Banská Bystrica players
MŠK Novohrad Lučenec players
TJ Baník Ružiná players
Expatriate footballers in the Czech Republic
FK Viktoria Žižkov players
MŠK Rimavská Sobota players
FC ViOn Zlaté Moravce players
Slovak Super Liga players
Expatriate footballers in Thailand
Peter Durica
People from Banská Bystrica District
Sportspeople from the Banská Bystrica Region